Marco Antonio Escobar, better known online as Omar Gosh, is an American YouTube personality. Omar has videos consisting of adventures, pranks, and paranormal videos on his YouTube channel OmarGoshTV, and vlogs on his secondary channel The Omar Gosh. As of May 2021 he has more than 3.8 million subscribers and more than 590 million views.

YouTube

Helping people in need 
In June 2014 Omar filmed a video going around and handing out socks, shoes and flip flops to the homeless with his son, inspiring others.

As he gained online attention, in July 2014 with the help of the charity Amazing Love Ministries he was able to hand out more socks and shoes to homeless and washing their feet.

In 2015 Omar filmed a video acting as homeless and going out to homeless people and ask for money to see if they are generous while they help him, he pays them back with extra money.

In 2016 Omar while filming prank videos ran into a man who claimed that he traveled for work from Seattle to Florida to find a job while had no luck and got stuck for 8 years living as a homeless, Omar buys him a bus ticket for him to go back to his family. The video went viral.

References 

Living people
1982 births
Place of birth missing (living people)
YouTube vloggers
American YouTubers
YouTube channels launched in 2013